The Eyes was a series of science fiction novels written in the 1970s by Richard Gordon under the pen name Stuart Gordon. 

The series is set in a post-apocalyptic world where the same nature was torn and mutated. The origin of the catastrophe is uncertain, due to the passing of centuries and to the sheer scale of destruction it unleashed upon the land. In book two it is hinted that the original cause might be a large-scale nuclear war or a cometary impact. 
The plot revolves around a mutant child with god-like powers called the Divine Mutant, the reincarnation of a former mutant king born one thousand years before, shortly after the catastrophe, who is determined to spread chaos in the slowly rebuilding world. Most of the events are seen through the eyes of a group of people involved in his schemes.

Series
One-Eye. (1973)
Two-Eyes. (1974) 
Three-Eyes. (1975)

Plot

Book One

The first book deals with the birth of the Divine Mutant in the ancient city of Phadraig (where mutants are swiftly put to death at birth) and his escape in the northern wastelands, aided by his mother and by a group of former heroes-adventurers of the city. In the north the Divine Mutant reckons with his ancient lieutenants, a group of 30 powerful mutants from his ancient reign who managed to hibernate and await his reincarnation. After the meeting, the newborn and his followers defeat Khassam, a powerful mutant overlord who had declared himself the Divine Mutant and assembled an army some 10,000 strong in order to conquer the southern lands. The true Divine Mutant manages to destroy Khassam's mind and routs his army by seeding chaos in the minds of its soldiers, who start killing each other in a deranged frenzy. The Divine Mutants lets some survivors (including his former companions, no longer necessary for his protection) escape into the nearby lands so to spread further disorder.

Book Two 

The second book is set just some days after the end of the first one. It revolves around Liam, a former bard and one of the Phadraig ex-adventurers of the first novel, who roams the lands of Miir (northwest of Phadraig and of Khassam's camp) after the dispersion of Khassam army and the separation from his comrades. While the Divine Mutant's madness begins to spread around the country, Liam - still shocked by the events of the first book - meets and befriends Tshea, a noblewoman of the ancient city of Ussian. The two manage to survive the surrounding chaos, and Liam discovers that, by playing his ancient technological instrument, he has the power to influence the minds of other people. In particular, he finds he is able to harness the madness induced by the Mutant and to turn it into more positive thoughts. Together Liam and Tshcea reach the Delta of Miir region, where the imminent fulfillment of an ancient prophecy related to the legendary Zuni Bird has gathered thousands of people fleeing from the burning nearby lands. Here Liam plays his songs and, with the aid of an ancient artifact hidden in the swamps of the delta, manages to turn the tide against the impending chaos, himself disappearing in the process.

Science fiction novel series